In enzymology, an adenosylhomocysteine nucleosidase is an enzyme that catalyzes the chemical reaction

S-adenosyl-L-homocysteine + H2O  S-(5-deoxy-D-ribos-5-yl)-L-homocysteine + adenine

Thus, the two substrates of this enzyme are S-adenosyl-L-homocysteine and H2O, whereas its two products are S-(5-deoxy-D-ribos-5-yl)-L-homocysteine and adenine.

This enzyme belongs to the family of hydrolases, specifically those glycosylases that hydrolyse N-glycosyl compounds.  The systematic name of this enzyme class is S-adenosyl-L-homocysteine homocysteinylribohydrolase. Other names in common use include S-adenosylhomocysteine hydrolase (ambiguous), S-adenosylhomocysteine nucleosidase, 5'-methyladenosine nucleosidase, S-adenosylhomocysteine/5'-methylthioadenosine nucleosidase, and AdoHcy/MTA nucleosidase.  This enzyme participates in methionine metabolism.

Structural studies

References

 
 

EC 3.2.2
Enzymes of known structure